The women's 3000 metres walk event  at the 1989 IAAF World Indoor Championships was held at the Budapest Sportcsarnok in Budapest on 3 and 4 March.

Medalists

Results

Heats
First 2 of each heat (Q) and next 6 fastest (q) qualified for the final.

Final

References

3000
Racewalking at the IAAF World Indoor Championships